Jackson's Military Road was a 19th-century route connecting Nashville, Tennessee, with New Orleans, Louisiana.  After the War of 1812, Congress appropriated funds in 1816 to build and improve this road. It was completed in 1820. The road was named for then General Andrew Jackson, hero of the United States victory at the Battle of New Orleans against British forces.

Construction
The appropriation for Jackson's Military Road was made on April 24, 1816:
Be it enacted by the Senate and House of Representatives of the United States of America, in Congress assembled, That the sum of ten thousand dollars be and are hereby appropriated, and payable out of any moneys in the treasury not otherwise appropriated for the purpose of repairing and keeping in repair the road between Columbia on Duck River in the state of Tennessee, and Madisonville in the state of Louisiana, by the Choctaw Agency, and also the road between Fort Hawkins, in the state of Georgia, and Fort Stoddard, under the direction of the Secretary of War.

On September 24, 1816, William H. Crawford, Secretary of War, informed General Andrew Jackson, then commanding the Army district at Nashville, of the appropriation, and directing that $5,000 be spent on the road to Louisiana. He noted that "I have received no information of the length of this road, the nature of the country through which it passes, or its present state. If there are many bridges to be erected the appropriation will be inadequate to the object. In that event the employment of a part of the troops may become necessary."

Jackson was officially in charge of the entire construction, including the First and Eighth Infantry and the artillery detachment who supplied the labor. However, his subordinates directly supervised much of the construction. Captain H. Young surveyed the route, completing this task by June 1817. They found that bridges were needed, and Congress appropriated an additional $5,000 in March 1818. Major Perrin Willis took command of the construction gang, then numbering about fifty, in April 1819, when the road reached the Pearl River. The road was completed in May 1820, after 75,801 man-days of labor.

Description
The Tuscumbian of Tuscumbia, Alabama, printed a description of "General Jackson's Military Road" on November 12, 1824. It states its length at 436 miles (Nashville to Madisonville) or 516 miles (Nashville to New Orleans),  shorter than the historic Natchez Trace. The article describes the construction gang as averaging 300, "including sawyers, carpenters, blacksmiths, etc."

From Columbia, Tennessee, the Military Road passed through Lawrenceburg and crossed the Tennessee River at Florence, Alabama. The road intersected the Gaines Trace at Russellville, Alabama (where it still exists as Jackson Avenue). It cut cross-country through what was the territory of the Choctaw Nation, in what later developed as the states of Alabama and Mississippi. 

In Hamilton, Alabama, "Military Street" marks the route of the Military Road. The road crossed the Tombigbee River in Columbus, Mississippi; the route still exists in that town and still bears the name "Military Road" from the Alabama border to downtown. West of the Tombigbee, the road passed through lands later assigned to Lowndes, Noxubee, Kemper, Newton, Jasper, Jones, Marion, and Pearl River counties, before crossing into Louisiana at the Pearl River twenty miles (32 km) west of today's Poplarville, Mississippi. The road continued directly from the future site of Bogalusa, Louisiana, to Madisonville, Louisiana, on the north shore of Lake Pontchartrain.

Jackson's Military Road declined in importance in the 1840s due to disrepair and the difficulty of keeping it passable through the swamps of the Noxubee River. It was largely replaced by the Robinson Road. (Available information about Robinson Road is scant, but it apparently linked Columbus, Mississippi, and Jackson, the city which was designated in the early 1820s as Mississippi's capital.) 

The route later became part of the Jackson Highway.

References

External links

RussellvilleGov.com (2004). "History of Russellville". Archived page of 22 March 2004.
Map of the entire route, Jackson's Military Road Accessed 11 November 2014.
Description and map in the Encyclopedia of Alabama. Accessed 2022-07-25.

Historic trails and roads in the United States
Historic trails and roads in Tennessee
Historic trails and roads in Alabama
Historic trails and roads in Mississippi
Historic trails and roads in Louisiana
Military roads